The 1983–84 Associate Members' Cup was the first staging of the Associate Members' Cup, a knock-out competition for English football clubs in the Third Division and the Fourth Division. The winners were Bournemouth and the runners-up were Hull City.

The competition began on 20 February 1984 and ended with the final on 24 May 1984 at Boothferry Park, the home stadium of the losing finalists.

In the first round, there were two sections: North and South. In the following rounds each section gradually eliminates teams in knock-out fashion until each has a winning finalist. At this point, the two winning finalists faced each other in the combined final for the honour of the trophy.

First round

Northern Section

Southern Section

Second round
In this round, in each section, the 6 winners and the 2 "lucky losers" progressed to the quarter-finals. Lucky losers are marked with the letters LL.

Northern Section

Southern Section

Quarter-finals

Northern Section

Southern Section

Area semi-finals

Northern Section

Southern Section

Area finals

Northern Area final

Southern Area final

Final

Notes
General
statto.com

Specific

1983-84
Tro
1983–84 domestic association football cups